The George Stone Technical Center is a school in Escambia County, Florida. Its purpose is to help adults and teenagers learn a career trade. It is located near Pine Forest High School and West Florida Technical High School.

References

 
High schools in Florida
Vocational schools in the United States
High schools in Escambia County, Florida